Emilio Giassetti (February 11, 1906 – July 4, 1957) was an Italian basketball player who competed in the 1936 Summer Olympics. He was born in Trieste. Giassetti was part of the Italian basketball team that finished seventh in the Olympic tournament. He played four matches.

References

part 7 the basketball tournament
Emilio Giassetti's profile at Sports Reference.com

1906 births
1957 deaths
Sportspeople from Trieste
People from Austrian Littoral
Italian Austro-Hungarians
Italian men's basketball players
Olympic basketball players of Italy
Basketball players at the 1936 Summer Olympics